Sirons Mill is an unincorporated community in Highland County, Virginia, United States. The community is situated in the Bullpasture River Valley on Mill Run, a tributary of the Bullpasture River.

References

Unincorporated communities in Highland County, Virginia
Unincorporated communities in Virginia